Klub Sportowy Górnik Libiąż is a Polish professional football club based in Libiąż.

On January 30, 2014, the club returned to the historical name of KS Górnik Libiąż, which functioned from its foundation until 1996, when the name was changed to Janina Libiąż. The club's greatest success to date are appearances in the third division.

Grounds

Górnik plays its matches at Municipal Stadium in Libiąż.

Rivals 
Main rivals are neighbours Unia Oświęcim and Fablok Chrzanów.

Players

Current squad

References

External links
90minut.pl profile
Official 1st team website
Official youth academy website

Association football clubs established in 1945
1945 establishments in Poland
Football clubs in Lesser Poland Voivodeship